Island World was a film company formed in 1988. They originally produced anime, but then over the years made live action films. It shut down in 1995 after producing The Cure.

Films
Toy Soldiers
Strictly Business
Juice
Carry On Columbus
Laws of Gravity
American Heart
Amongst Friends
Watch It
The Sandlot
A Dangerous Woman
Airheads
The War
The Cure

Television
Untiled The Sandlot TV series

Mass media companies established in 1988
Mass media companies disestablished in 1995
Film production companies of the United States